The Center of Studies of Ancient Near Eastern History (known by its Spanish acronym CEHAO) is a university-based research institution of the Pontifical Catholic University of Argentina, Buenos Aires, Argentina, focused on the history and archaeology of the Ancient Near East. The CEHAO has many periodical publications. The center's flagship is Antiguo Oriente, an annual peer-reviewed journal. CEHAO also publishes, jointly with the Society of Biblical Literature, the open-access peer-reviewed Ancient Near East Monographs (ANEM). Finally, Damqatum, an annual journal aimed at the general public with publications of preliminary high-impact research results. 

The CEHAO share research programs and scholars with the Institute of Social Sciences Research (IICS) of the Pontifical Catholic University of Argentina. Egyptologists Alicia Daneri and Perla Fuscaldo, biblical scholars René Krüger and Pablo Andiñach, and archaeologist Amir Gorzalczany are researchers in the CEHAO.

Directors 
 Roxana Flammini (2002-2011, 2017)
 Juan Manuel Tebes (2012-2016 and since 2018)

Researchers 
 Alicia Daneri 
 Perla Fuscaldo
 René Krüger
 Pablo Andiñach
 Amir Gorzalczany

References

External links
  CEHAO Webpage
  ARCH University of Oxford

Ancient Near East organizations
History institutes
International research institutes
History organisations based in Argentina
Catholic universities and colleges in Argentina